Jyothi Krishna is an Indian actor and director in the Tamil and Telugu film industries.

Career
Jyothi Krishna at 17 was credited with the story of his father, A. M. Ratnam's production Natpukaaga, starring Sarath Kumar and the film performed well at the box office. He was also story writer for the Chiranjeevi's film Sneham Kosam and was also involved in story discussions of Rajinikanth's hit film Padayappa. He went on to make his directorial debut in the A. R. Rahman musical Enakku 20 Unakku 18, starring Tarun, Trisha Krishnan and Shriya Saran. His next, Kedi, featured his brother Ravi Krishna in the lead role, whilst Ileana D'Cruz and Tamannaah Bhatia were also in the cast.

In 2010, Jyothi Krishna began work on his acting debut with Ooh La La La, scheduled for release in 2012. His latest directorial project is Oxygen, set to release on 30 November 2017.

Filmography

As actor

As director

As writer
Natpukkaga (1998)
Padayappa (1999) (story discussion)

As co-producer
Vedalam (2015)

References

External links 

Living people
Indian male film actors
Male actors in Tamil cinema
Tamil film directors
Telugu people
21st-century Indian male actors
Year of birth missing (living people)